Lastarriaea coriacea is a species of flowering plant in the buckwheat family known by the common name leather spineflower. It is native to California and adjacent northern Mexico where it is a common plant of many habitat types. This is an annual herb forming a patch of stems growing flat on the ground or rising slightly to a maximum height near 15 centimeters. The small leaves are located basally, where the stems emerge from the ground. They are generally hairy and linear in shape, and not more than 3 centimeters long. The stems branch into wide inflorescences bearing pointed bracts and flowers with spiky awns.

External links
Jepson Manual Treatment
USDA Plants Profile
Photo gallery

Polygonaceae
Flora of California
Flora of Baja California
Flora without expected TNC conservation status